Odax is a genus of marine ray-finned fish, weed whitings from the family Odacidae which are native to the Pacific waters of New Zealand.

Species
There are currently two recognized species in this genus:
 Odax cyanoallix Ayling & Paxton, 1983 (Bluefinned butterfish)
 Odax pullus (J. R. Forster, 1801) (Butterfish)

In addition to these, the Australian herring cale has frequently been placed in this genus.

References

 
Odacidae
Marine fish genera
Taxa named by Achille Valenciennes